Temiz is a surname. Notable people with the surname include:
 İsmail Temiz (born 1954), Turkish former wrestler
 Okay Temiz (born 1939), Turkish fusion jazz percussionist and drummer
 (born 1962), Turkish musician and folklorist